Procalpurnus semistriatus is a species of sea snail, a marine gastropod mollusk in the family Ovulidae, the ovulids, cowry allies or false cowries.

Description

Distribution

References

 Pease W. H. (1863). Description of new species of marine shells from the Pacific Islands. Proceedings of the Zoological Society of London. (1862): 240–243.
 Cate, C. N. 1973. A systematic revision of the recent Cypraeid family Ovulidae. Veliger 15 (supplement): 1–117.
 Lorenz F. & Fehse D. (2009) The living Ovulidae. A manual of the families of allied cowries: Ovulidae, Pediculariidae and Eocypraeidae. Hackenheim: Conchbooks.

External links

Ovulidae
Gastropods described in 1862